John Bernard (fl. 1374–1390) from Hythe, Kent was an English politician.

Family
Before 1366, Bernard married Joan Coul, who was the daughter and heiress of Richard Coul, also of Hythe. They had one daughter, whose name is unrecorded.

Career
He was a Member (MP) of the Parliament of England for Hythe in 1378, May 1382, October 1383, April 1384 and 1386. He may have been involved in the cloth trade, but little is known of him.

References

14th-century births
Year of death missing
English MPs 1378
English MPs May 1382
English MPs October 1383
English MPs April 1384
English MPs 1386
14th-century English politicians
People from Hythe, Kent